The 2020–21 East of Scotland Football League (known as the Central Taxis East of Scotland League for sponsorship reasons) was the 92nd season of the East of Scotland Football League, and the 7th season as the sixth tier of the Scottish football pyramid system. Bo'ness United were the reigning champions but could not defend their title after being promoted to the Lowland Football League.

The start of the league season was delayed until October 2020 because of the COVID-19 pandemic, and games were played behind closed doors due to Scottish Government restrictions.

On 11 January 2021 the league was suspended by the Scottish Football Association due to the escalating pandemic situation. On 11 April clubs voted to declared the season null and void.

Teams
The following teams changed division after the 2019–20 season.

To East of Scotland Football League
Returned from Abeyance
 Eyemouth United
Transferred from East Superleague North
 Luncarty
Transferred from East Superleague South
 Kennoway Star Hearts
 Lochore Welfare
 Thornton Hibs
Transferred from East Premier League South
 Kirkcaldy & Dysart
 Lochgelly Albert
 Newburgh
 Rosyth
Transferred from Lothian and Edinburgh Amateur Football League
 Edinburgh South

From East of Scotland Football League
Promoted to Lowland Football League
 Bo'ness United

Premier Division

Teams
No clubs were relegated at the end of the 2019–20 season. Therefore all clubs remain in the Premier Division (except promoted Bo'ness United) along with the winners of First Division Conference A and B (Lothian Thistle Hutchison Vale and Tynecastle), plus the runners-up with the best points per game record (Inverkeithing Hillfield Swifts).

Stadia and locations

League table

Results

First Division
The 31 First Division clubs were assigned a place in Conference A or B based on their performances in the 2019–20 season.

Conference A

Stadia and locations

Notes

League table

Conference B

Stadia and locations

League table

Notes
 Club with an SFA Licence eligible to participate in the Lowland League promotion play-off should they win the Premier Division.

References

External links

East of Scotland Football League
6
SCO
East of Scotland Football League